The Niagara Falls Marriott Fallsview Hotel & Spa is a 197 feet (60 m) tall hotel in Niagara Falls, Ontario. The hotel opened in 1998 with over 20 room floors, as well as three additional levels for Spa, Lobby, and Restaurant/Mezzanine. The addition of a second tower section in the year 2002 increased the number of rooms by 185 across 14 guest floors in a 17-story structure.

Being one of the tallest structures in the region, it can be seen throughout the general tourist area.

See also
Marriott International
Marriott Hotels
Niagara Fallsview Casino Resort
Marriott on the Falls Hotel

References
 Niagara Falls Marriott Fallsview Hotel & Spa
 Niagara Falls Marriott Fallsview Hotel & Spa | Skyscraper Page

Buildings and structures in Niagara Falls, Ontario
Hotels in Ontario
Marriott hotels
Skyscraper hotels in Canada
Hotel buildings completed in 1998
Hotels established in 1998